The CHL Executive of the Year award is given out annually to the top executive in the Canadian Hockey League. The award has not been conferred since 2002. Recipients are chosen from the winners of the respective constituent league awards: the OHL Executive of the Year, the Lloyd Saunders Memorial Trophy (WHL), and the John Horman Trophy (QMJHL).

Winners
List of winners of the CHL Executive of the Year award.

See also
 List of Canadian Hockey League awards

References

External links
 CHL Awards – CHL

Canadian Hockey League trophies and awards